Concerto for Wind Ensemble may refer to:

 Concerto for Wind Ensemble (Bryant)
 Concerto for Wind Ensemble (Husa)